John Franklin Houseman (January 10, 1870 in the Netherlands – November 4, 1922 in Chicago) was a Major League Baseball player.

Houseman was the first Dutch-born player in the major leagues when he made his debut for the Colts in 1894.

On December 30, 1903, Houseman and fellow player Charlie Dexter were in a box watching the show at the Iroquois Theatre in Chicago when the Iroquois Theatre fire broke out; they were credited with breaking down a locked door and rescuing a number of people.

Sources

External links 
 Frank Houseman at Iroquois Theater

1870 births
1922 deaths
19th-century baseball players
Chicago Colts players
St. Louis Browns (NL) players
Major League Baseball second basemen
Major League Baseball players from the Netherlands
Grand Rapids Shamrocks players
Joliet Convicts players
Aurora Indians players
Evansville Hoosiers players
Rock Island-Moline Twins players
Springfield Ponies players
Springfield Maroons players
Johnstown Buckskins players
Richmond Blue Birds players
New Orleans Pelicans (baseball) players
Atlanta Colts players
Birmingham Reds players
Mobile Blackbirds players
Houston Buffaloes players
Dutch emigrants to the United States